Phyllocnistis tethys is a moth   of the family Gracillariidae. It is found in southern Brazil.

The larvae feed on Passiflora organensis. They mine the leaves of their host plant.

References

Moths described in 2012
Phyllocnistis
Endemic fauna of Brazil
Moths of South America